The Gentleman Bushranger is a 1921 Australian film melodrama from director Beaumont Smith. Bushranging films were banned at the time but Smith got around this by making the plot about a man falsely accused of being a bushranger.

Plot
In 1857, an Englishman, Richard Lavender (Ernest Hearne), is travelling to Australia on a ship where he meets the beautiful Kitty Aronson. He is falsely accused by Peter Dargin (Tal Ordell) of murdering the ship's captain and is arrested. With the escape of an aboriginal friend, he escapes into the bush where he becomes a gold prospector. He meets Kitty, who runs a nearby selection, and they happily mine gold together until Dargin arrives and frames him for bushranger crimes. However Lavender ultimately proves his innocence.

Comic relief is provided by Ah Wom Bat (John Cosgrove), a Chinese cook, and a touring theatrical company that presents a version of East Lynne in a country town.

Cast
 Dot McConville as Kitty Anson
 Ernest T Hearne as Richard Lavender
 Tal Ordell as Peter Dargin
 John Cosgrove as Ah Wom Bat
 Nada Conrade
 Monica Mack
 J.P. O'Neill
 Robert MacKinnon
 Fred Phillips
 Henry Lawson as himself

Production
Female star Dot McConville was advertised as "the Commonwealth's premier horsewoman".

The segment showing the troupe performing East Lynne was likely taken from a short films directed by John Cosgrove, An East Lynne Fiasco (1917).

The movie was shot in four weeks in October 1921. Two and a half weeks were spent on location in Bowral and Berrima, with interiors shot in Sydney at the Rushcutters Bay Studio.

Reception
 The Bulletin said the film "has some wonderfully beautiful scenic bits, but the story is a painful libel on 'A Stripe for Trooper   Casey,' which it professes to follow, and is beneath criticism. So is the producing, and a great deal of the acting."
 The Sydney Sun had no problem with the adaptation of Quinn's novel, but was distressed by anachronistic hairstyles and costumes, and found much of the acting uninspired.

References

External links
 
 The Gentleman Bushranger at National Film and Sound Archive

1922 films
1922 Western (genre) films
1922 drama films
Australian black-and-white films
Australian drama films
Bushranger films
Films directed by Beaumont Smith
Melodrama films
Silent Australian Western (genre) films
Silent drama films